Bab Biduiyeh or Bab-e Biduiyeh may refer to:
 Bab Biduiyeh, Bardsir, Kerman Province